Dustabad may refer to:
 Dustabad, Fars
 Dustabad, Mashhad, Razavi Khorasan Province
 Dustabad, Quchan, Razavi Khorasan Province
 Dustabad, Torbat-e Jam, Razavi Khorasan Province
 Dustabad, South Khorasan
 Dustabad, Zirkuh, South Khorasan Province
 Dustabad, Tashkent Province, Uzbekistan